The Bigeard cap is a field cap worn by the French Army and several others. It was allegedly invented by French General Marcel Bigeard to replace the colorful and less practical colored headgear worn by the French Army in its war in Indochina.

The Bigeard is a cloth field cap with a short cloth peak. Originally produced in lizard, it was later produced in olive green and various camouflage patterns to include, forest, and desert. The cap is more of a peaked sidecap and is available with or without neck flaps for sun protection.

Users

Several armies have copied the design, Rhodesian army as the "swallowtail cap"  in English or "Quico" (pronounced kiko) in Portuguese vertical lizard

See also
 Sen bou The former Imperial Japanese Army's field cap with which the Bigeard is similar too in form and function.
 patrol cap

References

20th-century fashion
Caps
French military uniforms